Alburnus doriae is a species of cyprinid fish from Iran. It was previously thought to be restricted to central Iran, but recent research shows that it is more widespread and that Alburnus amirkabiri and Petroleuciscus esfahani are probably a synonyms of Alburnus doriae.

Description
Alburnus doriae is a fish with a slender body which shows marked lateral compression with as lightly convex or straight dorsal profile. It has a pointed snout and the lower jaw normally projects beyond the upper jaw, the snout being at least as long as the diameter of the eye and equal to the interorbital distance, the interorbital area is concave. The mouth points upwards. The maximum standard length is 134mm. The back is dark olive-brown through to grey in colour with silver on the flanks, belly and lower part of the head, a dark grey strip runs from the back of the eye to the caudal peduncle with darker brown spots below and above the lateral line. The fins lack colour apart from the bases of the pectoral fins and pelvic fins which are orange.

Distribution
Alburnus doriae is endemic to Iran where it is found in two endorheic drainage basins, that of the Zayandeh River close to the city of Ishfahan and in the Qom and Gareh-Chai Rivers which are tributaries of the salt lake, Namak, It has also been recorded from the stream known as Shahrekord, which flows into the Karun River, the lowermost tributary of the Tigris.

Naming
Alburnus doriae was described by the Italian zoologist Filippo de Filippi in 1865 from specimens collected by Giacomo Doria in 1862 from "around Shiraz". The specific name honours Doria.

References

doriae
Fish described in 1865
Taxa named by Filippo De Filippi